Ellektra, also known as Ellen Calling, is a 2004 Belgian thriller drama film directed by Rudolf Mestdagh starring Axelle Red and Matthias Schoenaerts.

Plot
Following a tragic accident, a number of people lose their principal gift. A DJ loses his hearing, a perfume maker loses his sense of smell, a pianist loses her fingers. Hiding behind the mysterious name eLLektra, a young girl brings those people together through SMS and offers them comfort for their loss.

Cast
 Axelle Red as Anna
 Matthias Schoenaerts as DJ Cosmonaut X
 Catherine Kools as Ellen aka Ellektra
 Gert Portael as Sam
 Julien Schoenaerts as Waiter
 Ellen Ten Damme as Ellen
 Marie Bos as Cynthia
 Manou Kersting as Cabron
 Lucas Van Ammel as Ludovic
 Han Kerckhoffs as Harry

Accolades

References

External links 
 
 Rudolf Mestdagh website

2004 films
Dutch thriller drama films
Neo-noir
2000s French-language films
2000s Dutch-language films
2000s English-language films
Belgian thriller drama films
2000s thriller drama films
2004 drama films
2004 multilingual films
Belgian multilingual films
Dutch multilingual films
German multilingual films